Manoel Ceia Laranjeira (1903–1994) was a Brazilian Bishop of the Independent Catholicism movement, particularly the Brazilian Catholic Apostolic Church.

Biography
Laranjeira was in Brazil at an unknown date in 1903. He was ordained a priest and consecrated a Roman Catholic bishop, where he was still active until the early 1990s.

Manoel Ceia Laranjeira converted to the Brazilian Catholic Apostolic Church and was ordained a priest by excommunicated Roman Catholic Bishop Carlos Duarte Costa in 1947. He was consecrated Bishop by Salomão Barbosa Ferraz (who become Roman Catholic Bishop later) in 1951; after Salomão Barbosa Ferraz's submission to the Vatican, Laranjeira led the Brazilian Free Catholic Church as Ferraz's successor and renamed the movement the Independent Catholic Apostolic Church of Brazil, which was officially registered on August 25, 1966.

Laranjeira died at an unknown date on 1994 from an unknown cause. He was succeeded by Dom Lapercio Eudes Moreira and in turn by the current head of the movement, Dom Paulo Ferreira Da Silva as Patriarch and Dom Roberto Garrido Padin as Diocesan Bishop of Salvador de Bahia.

References
 Edward Jarvis, God Land & Freedom, The True Story of ICAB, Apocryphile Press, Berkeley CA, 2018
 https://web.archive.org/web/20190504165034/http://igrejacatolicaindependente.com.br/
 Independent Movement Database

Brazilian bishops
Former Roman Catholics
Bishops of the Free Catholic Church
20th-century bishops
1903 births
1994 deaths